Gerebald is another saint with essentially the same name

Saint Gerbold ( or saint Gerbold) (died c. 690 AD) was a French bishop venerated as a saint by the Catholic Church.  He was a monk who founded the abbey of Livry in Normandy and later became bishop of Bayeux.

References

External links

Bishops of Bayeux
690 deaths
7th-century Frankish saints
Year of birth unknown

Year of death uncertain